Yttria-stabilized zirconia (YSZ) is a ceramic in which the cubic crystal structure of zirconium dioxide is made stable at room temperature by an addition of yttrium oxide. These oxides are commonly called "zirconia" (ZrO2) and "yttria" (Y2O3), hence the name.

Stabilization 

Pure zirconium dioxide undergoes a phase transformation from monoclinic (stable at room temperature) to tetragonal (at about 1173 °C) and then to cubic (at about 2370 °C), according to the scheme

 monoclinic (1173 °C) ↔ tetragonal (2370 °C) ↔ cubic (2690 °C) ↔ melt.

Obtaining stable sintered zirconia ceramic products is difficult because of the large volume change, about 5%, accompanying the transition from tetragonal to monoclinic. Stabilization of the cubic polymorph of zirconia over wider range of temperatures is accomplished by substitution of some of the Zr4+ ions (ionic radius of 0.82 Å, too small for ideal lattice of fluorite characteristic for the cubic zirconia) in the crystal lattice with slightly larger ions, e.g., those of Y3+ (ionic radius of 0.96 Å). The resulting doped zirconia materials are termed stabilized zirconias.

Materials related to YSZ include calcia-, magnesia-, ceria- or alumina-stabilized zirconias, or partially stabilized zirconias (PSZ). Hafnia-stabilized zirconia has about 25% lower thermal conductivity, making it more suitable for thermal barrier applications.

Although 8–9 mol% YSZ is known to not be completely stabilized in the pure cubic YSZ phase up to temperatures above 1000 °C. 

Commonly used abbreviations in conjunction with yttria-stabilized zirconia are:

 Partly stabilized zirconia ZrO2:
 PSZ – partially stabilized zirconia
 TZP – tetragonal zirconia polycrystal
 4YSZ: with 4 mol% Y2O3 partially stabilized ZrO2, yttria-stabilized zirconia
 Fully stabilized zirconias ZrO2:
 FSZ – fully stabilized zirconia
 CSZ – cubic stabilized zirconia
 8YSZ – with 8 mol% Y2O3 fully stabilized ZrO2
 8YDZ – 8–9 mol% Y2O3-doped ZrO2: the material is not completely stabilized and decomposes at high application temperatures, see next paragraphs)

Thermal expansion coefficient 
The thermal expansion coefficients depends on the modification of zirconia as follows:
 Monoclinic: 7·10−6/K
 Tetragonal: 12·10−6/K
 Y2O3 stabilized: 10,5·10−6/K

Ionic conductivity of YSZ and its degradation 
By the addition of yttria to pure zirconia (e.g., fully stabilized YSZ) Y3+ ions replace Zr4+ on the cationic sublattice. Thereby, oxygen vacancies are generated due to charge neutrality:

 

meaning that two Y3+ ions generate one vacancy on the anionic sublattice. This facilitates moderate conductivity of yttrium-stabilized zirconia for O2− ions (and thus electrical conductivity) at elevated and high temperature. This ability to conduct O2− ions makes yttria-stabilized zirconia well suited for application as solid electrolyte in solid oxide fuel cells.

For low dopant concentrations, the ionic conductivity of the stabilized zirconias increases with increasing Y2O3 content. It has a maximum around 8–9 mol% almost independent of the temperature (800–1200 °C). Unfortunately, 8–9 mol% YSZ (8YSZ, 8YDZ) also turned out to be situated in the 2-phase field (c+t) of the YSZ phase diagram at these temperatures, which causes the material's decomposition into Y-enriched and depleted regions on the nanometre scale and, consequently, the electrical degradation during operation. The microstructural and chemical changes on the nanometre scale are accompanied by the drastic decrease of the oxygen-ion conductivity of 8YSZ (degradation of 8YSZ) of about 40% at 950 °C within 2500 hours. Traces of impurities like Ni, dissolved in the 8YSZ, e.g., due to fuel-cell fabrication, can have a severe impact on the decomposition rate (acceleration of inherent decomposition of the 8YSZ by orders of magnitude) such that the degradation of conductivity even becomes problematic at low operation temperatures in the range of 500–700 °C.

Nowadays, more complex ceramics like co-doped Zirconia (e.g., with scandia) are in use as solid electrolytes.

Applications

YSZ has a number of applications:
 For its hardness and chemical inertness (e.g., tooth crowns).
 As a refractory (e.g., in jet engines).
 As a thermal barrier coating in gas turbines.
 As an electroceramic due to its ion-conducting properties (e.g., to determine oxygen content in exhaust gases, to measure pH in high-temperature water, in fuel cells).
 Used in the production of a solid oxide fuel cell (SOFC). YSZ is used as the solid electrolyte, which enables oxygen ion conduction while blocking electronic conduction. In order to achieve sufficient ion conduction, an SOFC with a YSZ electrolyte must be operated at high temperatures (800–1000 °C). While it is advantageous that YSZ retains mechanical robustness at those temperatures, the high temperature necessary is often a disadvantage of SOFCs. The high density of YSZ is also necessary in order to physically separate the gaseous fuel from oxygen, or else the electrochemical system would produce no electrical power.
 For its hardness and optical properties in monocrystal form (see "cubic zirconia"), it is used as jewelry.
 As a material for non-metallic knife blades, produced by Boker and Kyocera companies.
 In water-based pastes for do-it-yourself ceramics and cements. These contain microscopic YSZ milled fibers or sub-micrometer particles, often with potassium silicate and zirconium acetate binders (at mildly acidic pH). The cementation occurs on removal of water. The resulting ceramic material is suitable for very high-temperature applications.
 YSZ doped with rare-earth materials can act as a thermographic phosphor and a luminescent material.
 Historically used for glowing rods in Nernst lamps.
 As a high-precision alignment sleeve for optical fiber connector ferrules.

See also

References

Further reading
 

Zirconium compounds
Refractory materials
Electrochemistry

de:Zirconium(IV)-oxid#Stabilisierung